Vasilios Apostolopoulos (born 13 August 1988) is a Greek professional footballer who plays as a centre back for Austrian club SK Bischofshofen.

Career
Ahead of the 2019/20 season, Apostolopoulos joined Austrian club SK Bischofshofen.

Club statistics

Updated to games played as of 8 June 2015.

References

External links
Profile at epae.org
Guardian Football

MLSZ
HLSZ

1988 births
Living people
Association football defenders
Atromitos F.C. players
Fehérvár FC players
Puskás Akadémia FC players
Rochester New York FC players
Nemzeti Bajnokság I players
Greek expatriate footballers
Expatriate footballers in Hungary
Greek expatriate sportspeople in Hungary
USL Championship players
Greece youth international footballers
Expatriate soccer players in the United States
Greek expatriate sportspeople in the United States
Footballers from Athens
Greek footballers